Manuel Rengifo Diaz (born 26 November 1985), better known as Mesajah, is a reggae singer and songwriter from Poland.

Career 
Born and raised in Wroclaw, Poland. His father comes from Peru, and his mother is Polish.

His musical career began in the Polish reggae band Natural Dread Killaz, which he founded with his brother Paxon and friend Yanaz. In 2008 he decided to try a solo career. His first album, called Ludzie prości, was released in September 2008. From this album comes his most popular song called Każdego dnia. The music video for this song has 22 million views on YouTube and is one of the most viewed videos of Mesajah. His second album Jestem stąd was released 15 February 2012. His third album, Brudna prawda, was released 7 June 2013. In 2016 he has released fourth album, Powrót do korzeni.

The lyrics of Mesajah's songs are sometimes critical and sometimes positive opinions about world and human relations.

Discography

Albums 
 2008: Ludzie prości, label: Pink Crow Records
 2012: Jestem stąd, label: Lion Stage Management
 2013: Brudna prawda, label: Urban Rec
 2016: Powrót do korzeni, label: Lou & Rocked Boys

References

Sources 

1985 births
Living people
Polish reggae singers